Andrew Boyle (died December 11, 1902) was an American politician from Maryland. He served as a member of the Maryland House of Delegates, representing Harford County in 1876.

Career
Boyle was a Democrat. Boyle ran for the Democratic nomination of the Maryland House of Delegates in the 1873 election. Boyle was a member of the Maryland House of Delegates, representing Harford County in 1876. He was unsuccessful in running for the Democratic nomination in the 1877 election.

Personal life
Boyle had several children.

Boyle was president of the Red Seal Packing Association, which was an organization of canners.

Boyle died on December 11, 1902, at the age of 80, at his daughter's home in Port Deposit, Maryland.

References

Year of birth uncertain
1820s births
1902 deaths
People from Harford County, Maryland
Democratic Party members of the Maryland House of Delegates